Anže Zorc (born 6 February 1994) is a football midfielder from Slovenia. He plays for Bravo in the Slovenian Second League.

References

External links
Player profile at PrvaLiga 

1994 births
Living people
Sportspeople from Kranj
Slovenian footballers
Association football midfielders
NK Olimpija Ljubljana (2005) players
Slovenian PrvaLiga players
Slovenian expatriate footballers
Slovenian expatriate sportspeople in Austria
Expatriate footballers in Austria
Slovenia youth international footballers